"Heaven on Dirt" is a song recorded by Canadian country artist Gord Bamford. The track was written by Jason Lee Owens Jr., Philip O'Donnell, Casey Beathard, and Jenee Fleenor. It is the third single off Bamford's ninth studio album Diamonds in a Whiskey Glass.

Background
Bamford remarked that "this type of song only comes along once in a lifetime". He called the track's writers some of his "favourite hit songwriters", saying he was "very fortunate to have the opportunity to record it".

Critical reception
Nanci Dagg called the track an "upbeat ballad", with the "Gord Bamford sound that we so easily recognize and love". The Music Express referred to the song as a "power ballad", saying it "embraces Country storytelling and reflects on the feeling of finding your true joy in life".

Accolades

Charts

References
 

2021 songs
2021 singles
Gord Bamford songs
Anthem Records singles
Songs written by Casey Beathard
Songs written by Phil O'Donnell (songwriter)